The Kids in the Hall: Death Comes to Town (or simply Death Comes to Town) is an eight-episode Canadian mini-series that aired on CBC Television on Tuesdays between January 12 and March 16, 2010. The show takes place in a fictional Ontario town called Shuckton where their mayor has been murdered. As the Shuckton residents cope with the loss, a new lawyer moves in to prosecute a suspect – though another resident, unsatisfied with the evidence, tries to find the real killer. At the same time, a character who is a personification of death waits at a motel room for the latest Shuckton residents to die.

The series was proposed by Bruce McCulloch during a 2008 The Kids in the Hall comedy tour and developed by the ensemble into a dark-comedy murder mystery, a departure from their typical sketch comedy format. Inspiration for the series came in part from the British comedy series The League of Gentlemen. While the members of The Kids in the Hall play all of the major adult characters, a number of other comedic actors appear in supporting roles, including Dan Redican, Colin Mochrie, Wayne Robson, Leah N.H. Philpott, Susan Kent and Mike Beaver. The series was filmed in North Bay, Mattawa, and Sturgeon Falls, Ontario in the summer of 2009.

Premise
The mayor of Shuckton, Ontario (population 27,063) is murdered several hours after announcing that the town's bid for the 2028 Summer Olympics was rejected. A small-time criminal, Crim, is found with blood on him and is put on trial for the murder. However, an obese man named Ricky suspects the real murderer is still at large and, with the help of his friend Marnie, he investigates the crime. Meanwhile, the mayor's widow takes over mayoral duties, women on a local news team compete for attention, the coroner steals the mayor's body, Crim's lawyer does everything he can to keep his cat alive, and Death waits in a motel room to collect the souls of dead Shuckton citizens.

Characters
All major characters in the miniseries were played by the five members of The Kids in the Hall, except for the mayor's son, who was played by young actor Landon Reynolds-Trudel. Several of the original The Kids in the Hall characters appear in cameo roles, including Mark McKinney's Chicken Lady as a candidate juror and Paul Bellini clad only in his towel at an ATM; in addition, McCulloch and McKinney's police officers are tweaked variations of their OPP officer characters of the original series.

Other actors who appeared in supporting roles include Dan Redican, Colin Mochrie, Wayne Robson, Leah N.H. Philpott, Jesse Camacho, and Mike Beaver.

Larry Bowman (Bruce McCulloch), a former US draft dodger, mayor and former hockey coach of Shuckton. Although shown abusing the powers of his office, he is beloved by the townspeople.
Marilyn Bowman (Dave Foley) is Larry's unhappy alcoholic wife. As requested in the mayor's will, Marilyn becomes mayor and seeks economic development opportunities for the town.
Rampop (Landon Reynolds-Trudel) is Larry and Marilyn's adopted son. He responds to questions with screeches and chirps, he flails his arms when he runs, and he sees all humans as large animated butterflies. His mother calls him "special" but Rampop is the only member of his family who knows which remote control turns on the TV and is the only one who can see Death in his true form and communicate with him.
Marnie (Kevin McDonald) is a middle-aged delivery driver for the local pizzeria who is prone to frequent spells of forgetfulness she refers to as "the Fuzzies."
Ricky Jarvis (McCulloch) is an obese man who has not left his house since he lost a hockey tournament; as the captain of the town's hockey team, he lost all his stamina in sex with a rival team's cheerleader the night before the final game.
Crimson "Crim" Hollingsworth (Scott Thompson) is a small-time criminal who self-identifies as one-sixteenth Ojibwe. He is the prime suspect of Larry's murder.
Corrinda Gablechuck (Mark McKinney) is the field reporter for the local TV news. After becoming pregnant with Shaye's child, she becomes conflicted on whether to stay pregnant or have an abortion.
Heather Weather (Thompson) is the weather reporter for the local TV news. She battles Corrinda for the spotlight. She is suspected of the murder when Marilyn learns Heather may have had an affair with Larry.
Levon Blanchard (Foley) is the news producer, visibly frustrated by Corrinda and Heather's rivalry.
Shaye (McDonald) is the news team's boom microphone operator. He sleeps with Corrinda only after being rejected by other women at the local bar.
Dusty Diamond (Thompson) is the town coroner who secretly harboured feelings for Mayor Bowman.
"Big City" (McCulloch) is a lawyer who is prosecuting Crim for the murder of Larry Bowman. He uses showmanship to dazzle the judge and jury.
Sam Murray (McDonald) is the inexperienced local public defense lawyer. Not understanding quality of life, he incurs expensive veterinarian bills keeping his sick 32-year-old cat, Buttonhole, alive.
Death (McKinney) is a grim reaper assigned to collect souls from Shuckton. He has personal vendetta against Ricky – who was supposed to be aborted before he was born, but who survived the procedure because Death was late to collect his soul. When off duty, he hangs out at the tavern, drinking owl's blood and flirting with voluptuous red-headed women.
Dr. "Doc" Porterhouse (Foley) is the kindly town abortion care provider. He is a talented doctor but uses odd tools and methods.
The Judge (McKinney) presides over Crim's murder trial. He is shown to be frustrated by the disappearance of his gavel and the gavel's replacements.
The Police Officers (McCulloch and McKinney) are investigating Mayor Bowman's murder.

Episodes

Production and style
During a reunion tour in summer 2008, The Kids in the Hall comedy troupe decided they would like to work together again. Since their 1996 movie Brain Candy, during which they had a falling out over creative differences, they had only worked together on live comedy tours and had not appeared on television together since the end of their show in 1995. Bruce McCulloch pitched a television story idea which the rest of the group liked. They spent a couple days together brainstorming and developing characters. The storyline resolved into a murder mystery miniseries – partly inspired by the British comedy series The League of Gentlemen. McCulloch described it as Corner Gas meets Twin Peaks. The format diverged from their typical sketch comedy style by following a continuous narrative – though side-stories explore characters further. Along with producer Susan Cavin in fall 2008, they pitched the concept to CBC executive Fred Fuchs who greenlit the project.

The troupe hired several of the people they had worked with on Brain Candy, including Craig Northey and director Kelly Makin. They shot the series in North Bay, along with locations in Mattawa and Sturgeon Falls, Ontario, which allowed them to access federal and provincial funding incentives for economic development in Northern Ontario. For example, the courtroom scenes were filmed in North Bay's Trinity United Church and the graveyard site was filmed on Mattawa's Explorer's Point. McKinney has claimed in interviews that the red vest worn by Death was found in a storehouse of old CBC props and costumes, and was previously worn by Bob Homme in The Friendly Giant. While drafting the script, cast member Scott Thompson was diagnosed with stage one non-Hodgkin lymphoma. He began chemotherapy sessions shortly before the August – September 2009 shooting dates and started four weeks of radiation treatment once shooting wrapped.

Broadcast and reception
The series was aired on CBC Television as eight 30-minute shows. It was broadcast between January 12 and March 16, 2010, on Tuesdays at 9 pm following news-comedy shows Rick Mercer Report and This Hour Has 22 Minutes. Death Comes to Town was one of three new prime-time  shows that CBC launched in the second week of January; the others were a detective comedy-drama Republic of Doyle and a family-oriented situation comedy 18 to Life. The debut of Death Comes to Town was watched by approximately 1.054 million viewers (60% in the 25-54 age demographic), higher than both Republic of Doyle and 18 to Life. The American cable network Independent Film Channel purchased the US broadcast rights and began broadcasting it on August 20, 2010.

In the Winnipeg Free Press, Brad Oswald reviewed the show cautiously, writing it that is "decidedly different, distinctly weird and definitely-an-acquired-taste kind of great" and that some characters and scenes "are edgy and uncompromising and sure to shock and offend nearly as many viewers as they amuse." In the Toronto Star Raju Mudhar wrote that the "humour is classic Kids, with plenty of visual gags mixed with off-colour, politically incorrect jokes" and that "the troupe's eye for satire remains sharp as ever". John Doyle in The Globe and Mail wrote a negative review concluding it was "a dismal coda to the comedy troupe's outstanding career". Doyle identified himself as a fan of the original The Kids in the Hall series but found that this show had "excruciatingly awful attempts at humour" and "no comic rhythm". Doyle called it "appallingly slow-witted TV", "mediocre and maddeningly pointless". In the Times-Colonist, Alex Strachan provided a qualified positive review writing that it was "juvenile, sophomoric and deliberately unsophisticated" but "a joy to watch". Strachan concludes that "Death Comes to Town is easy to dismiss as being lightweight, which it is, and scattershot, which it is. There's a genuine joie de vivre at work, though. Death Comes to Town is silly comedy for smart people."

Home media 
The complete mini-series was released on Region 1 DVD by Alliance Home Entertainment on August 3, 2010.

Notes

References

External links

Official site at cbc.ca
Press release from CBC

CBC Television original programming
2010 Canadian television series debuts
2010 Canadian television series endings
The Kids in the Hall
Television series about personifications of death
Television shows set in Ontario
2010s Canadian television miniseries
Canadian political comedy television series
2010s Canadian sitcoms
Television shows filmed in North Bay, Ontario